Kaiserslautern Hauptbahnhof is a through-station in the German city of Kaiserslautern and one of seven stations in the city. It is a stop on the Rhine-Neckar S-Bahn and Deutsche Bahn’s Intercity-Express network and a hub for all the regional trains of the western Palatinate. On 10 June 2007, the Rhealys high-speed rail consortium established a service with a stop in Kaiserslautern, reducing travel time to Paris to two and a half hours.

In 2003, the station building was renovated and it now houses among other things, a service point and several shops. The station provides step-free access to all platforms. The redesigned Kaiserslautern station forecourt includes a busy bus station, allowing a convenient transfer between bus and rail. Buses run to the University of Kaiserslautern, Betzenberg and the central bus interchanges at Schillerplatz and Rathaus, where there are connections to all bus routes.

Prior to the closure of the Einsiedlerhof marshalling yard, Kaiserslautern was a significant rail freight hub.

History 
Kaiserslautern Hauptbahnhof was opened in 1848 along with the Homburg–Kaiserslautern section of the Palatine Ludwig Railway. The Palatine Ludwig Railway is still the most important line serving the station.

On 16 May 1871 the Alsenz Valley Railway was completed from Bad Münster to Hochspeyer; its trains ran into Kaiserslautern. To shorten the route for long-distance traffic, a line was opened on 15 May 1875 between Kaiserslautern and Enkenbach (at the closest point on the Alsenz Valley Railway), allowing trains to run between Kaiserslautern, Bad Kreuznach and the Ruhr and between Kaiserslautern, Worms and Frankfurt without having to pass through Hochspeyer.

It received a new entrance building in 1879. The Lauter Valley Railway was opened on 15 November 1883 between Kaiserslautern and Lauterecken-Grumbach. In 1913 the Kaiserslautern–Waldfischbach line opened, completing the Biebermühl Railway to Pirmasens.

The second station building was badly damaged in the Second World War and demolished after the war. The current station building was completed in the early 1950s. It was rebuilt in 2003.

Connections

There are the following long-distance and local transport connections:

Long distance

S-Bahn and DB regional

Sources

Notes

References

External links

Railway stations in Rhineland-Palatinate
Buildings and structures in Kaiserslautern
Rhine-Neckar S-Bahn stations
Railway stations in Germany opened in 1848